Zhoushan (529) is a Type 054A frigate of the People's Liberation Army Navy. She was commissioned on 3 January 2008.

Development and design 

The Type 054A carries HQ-16 medium-range air defence missiles and anti-submarine missiles in a vertical launching system (VLS) system. The HQ-16 has a range of up to 50 km, with superior range and engagement angles to the Type 054's HQ-7. The Type 054A's VLS uses a hot launch method; a shared common exhaust system is sited between the two rows of rectangular launching tubes.

The four AK-630 close-in weapon systems (CIWS) of the Type 054 were replaced with two Type 730 CIWS on the Type 054A. The autonomous Type 730 provides improved reaction time against close-in threats.

Construction and career 
Zhoushan was launched on 19 December 2006 at the Hudong-Zhonghua Shipyard in Shanghai. Commissioned on 3 January 2008.

On July 16, 2009, Zhoushan, Xuzhou and Qiandaohu formed the third batch of the Chinese navy escort fleet, which set sail from Zhoushan, Zhejiang Province, to the Gulf of Aden and Somalia for escort missions in the sea. The escort lasted 158 days. After completing 53 escort missions and safely escorting 582 Chinese and foreign ships, the formation returned to a military port in Zhoushan, Zhejiang Province on December 20, 2009. Zhoushan and others visited Singapore and Malaysia on the return voyage, and docked in Hong Kong from December 14th to 17th, and received more than 7,000 people from all walks of life in Hong Kong.

On November 2, 2010, Zhoushan, Xuzhou and Qiandaohu formed the seventh batch of the Chinese navy escort fleet, which set sail from Zhoushan, Zhejiang Province, to the Gulf of Aden and Somalia Perform escort missions in the sea. The escort experienced 189 days and nights and a cumulative voyage of more than 110,000 nautical miles. Zhoushan and others are safely escorting 38 batches of 578 Chinese and foreign ships, escorting 1 ship attacked by pirates, rescued 1 ship attacked by pirates boarding, rescued 9 ships pursued by pirates 6 times, verified and driven away 218 suspicious ships After the second time, she returned to China on May 9, 2011. During the escort period, the formation successively met and exchanged with the commanders of the NATO 508 task force and the EU 465 task force. After completing the escort mission, Zhoushan also visited three African countries including Tanzania, South Africa, and Seychelles, and docked in Singapore.

On December 12, 2014, Zhoushan, Taizhou, Zhengzhou, Yiyang, Qiandaohu and the electronic reconnaissance ship Beijixing The ship crossed the Miyako Strait into the Western Pacific.

Gallery

References 

2006 ships
Ships built in China
Type 054 frigates